Mo Hussein (born 17 November 1962 in Hackney) is an English professional light/light welterweight boxer of the 1980s who won the British Boxing Board of Control (BBBofC) Southern Area lightweight title, and Commonwealth lightweight title, and was a challenger for the BBBofC British light welterweight title against Lloyd Christie, his professional fighting weight varied from , i.e. lightweight to , i.e. light welterweight. Mo Hussein was trained and managed by Jimmy Tibbs, and promoted by Frank Warren.

He has also had success as a trainer, training Irish champion Paul Upton.

References

External links

Image - Mo Hussein

1962 births
English male boxers
Lightweight boxers
Light-welterweight boxers
Living people
People from Hackney Central
Boxers from Greater London